Radio Television of Republika Srpska (Serbian: Радио Телевизија Републике Српске / Radio Televizija Republike Srpske or RTRS) is the entity-level public broadcaster which operates radio and television services in Republika Srpska, Bosnia and Herzegovina. It is the official public broadcasting service that covers government activities in the Republic of Srpska.

Services

Founded in 1992, RTRS broadcasts a 24-hour television channel known as Televizija Republike Srpske, and one radio station called Radio Republike Srpske. There is also a unit known as Muzička Produkcija RTRS ("Music Production Section of RTRS", locally known as MP RTRS for short) which was established in 2011.

Headquarters of RTRS is located in Banja Luka. Regional radio and TV studios are located in the following cities: Prijedor, Istočno Sarajevo, Bijeljina, Trebinje, Doboj and Brčko.

Radio and television programming is mainly produced in the Serbian language (in one of two alphabets: Cyrillic and Latin alphabet. Since April 2013, RTRS stations are broadcast on Eutelsat 16A (Team:Sat platform).

As of January 2015 RTRS consists of three organizational units:
 Radio Republike Srpske – public radio service 
 Televizija Republike Srpske – public television channel
 Muzička Produkcija RTRS – music production section of RTRS

On 19 April 2015, RTRS started to broadcast a second channel called RTRS PLUS.

History  
The first experimental programs of Radio Banja Luka were broadcast on 25 January 1967. Regular programming began on 2 February 1967.

In May 1992 Radio Banja Luka became the information-technical center for Bosnian Serb broadcasting, whose main office was in Pale. 

In December 1994, Serbian radio-television (Српска радио-телевизија (СРТ) / Srpska radio-televizija (SRT)) was founded, and programs from Banja Luka TV and radio studios were broadcast on demand. RTRS has a permanent staff of 100 journalists, editors, cameramen, musical collaborators and organizers.

See also 
  List of radio stations in Bosnia and Herzegovina
  Televizija Republike Srpske
  RTVFBiH
  BHRT

References

Sources
 Cokorilo, Radmila. Radio as media: Banja Luka: Faculty of Philosophy, 2009. .

External links 

  (in Serbian)
  
  
 State TV used by pro-Russian leader for political aims in Republika Srpska, Integrity Initiative, October 2018

 
Publicly funded broadcasters
Television stations in Bosnia and Herzegovina
Mass media in Banja Luka
Television channels and stations established in 1992
Government-owned companies of Bosnia and Herzegovina